The 1968 Summer Olympics, officially known as the Games of the XIX Olympiad and commonly known as Mexico 1968, were an international multi-sport event held from 12 to 27 October 1968 in Mexico City, Mexico. These were the first Olympic Games to be staged in Latin America and the first to be staged in a Spanish-speaking country. They were also the first Games to use an all-weather (smooth) track for track and field events instead of the traditional cinder track, as well as the first example of the Olympics exclusively using electronic timekeeping equipment.

The 1968 Games were the third to be held in the last quarter of the year, after the 1956 Games in Melbourne and the 1964 Games in Tokyo. The 1968 Mexican Student Movement was crushed days prior, hence the Games were correlated to the government's repression.

The United States won the most gold and overall medals for the last time until 1984.

Host city selection

On 18 October 1963, at the 60th IOC Session in Baden-Baden, West Germany, Mexico City finished ahead of bids from Detroit, Buenos Aires and Lyon to host the Games.

Olympic torch relay
The 1968 torch relay recreated the route taken by Christopher Columbus to the New World, journeying from Greece through Italy and Spain to San Salvador Island, Bahamas, and then on to Mexico.  American sculptor James Metcalf, an expatriate in Mexico, won the commission to forge the Olympic torch for the 1968 Summer Games.

Highlights

 In the medal award ceremony for the men's 200 metres race, Black American athletes Tommie Smith (gold) and John Carlos (bronze) took a stand for civil rights by raising their black-gloved fists and wearing black socks in lieu of shoes. The Australian Peter Norman, who had run second, wore an American "human rights" badge as support to them on the podium. In response, the IOC banned Smith and Carlos from the Olympic Games for life, and Norman's omission from Australia's Olympic team in 1972 was allegedly as punishment.
 George Foreman won the gold medal in heavyweight boxing division by defeating Soviet Ionas Chepulis via a second-round TKO. After the victory, Foreman waved a small American flag as he bowed to the crowd.
No other Summer Olympic Games before or since have been held at high elevation.
 In addition to high elevation, this was the first Olympics to use a synthetic all-weather surface for track and field events; the "Tartan" surface was originally developed by 3M for horse racing, but did not catch on.  The tracks at previous Olympics were conventional cinder.
 For the first time, East and West Germany competed as separate teams, after being forced by the IOC to compete as a combined German team in 1956, 1960, and 1964. 
 Al Oerter won his fourth consecutive gold medal in the discus to become only the second athlete to achieve this feat in an individual event, and the first in athletics.
 Bob Beamon leapt  in the long jump, an incredible  improvement over the previous world record. It  stood as the world record for 23 years, until broken by American Mike Powell in 1991; yet it has stood as the current Olympic record for  years. Jim Hines, Tommie Smith and Lee Evans also set long-standing world records in the 100 m, 200 m and 400 m, respectively.
 In the triple jump, the previous world record was improved five times by three different athletes. Winner Viktor Saneev also won in 1972 and 1976, and won silver in 1980.
 Dick Fosbury won the gold medal in the high jump using his unconventional Fosbury flop technique, which quickly became the dominant technique in the event.
 Věra Čáslavská of Czechoslovakia won four gold medals in gymnastics and protested the Soviet invasion of her country.
 Debbie Meyer became the first swimmer to win three individual gold medals, in the 200, 400 and 800 m freestyle events. The 800 m was a new long-distance event for women. Meyer was only 16 years old, a student at Rio Americano High School in Sacramento, California. Meyer was the first of several American teenagers to win the 800 m, with Katie Ledecky being her notable successor.
 American swimmer Charlie Hickcox won three gold medals (200m IM, 400m IM, 4 × 100 m medley relay) and one silver medal (100m backstroke).
 The introduction of doping tests resulted in the first disqualification because of doping: Swedish pentathlete Hans-Gunnar Liljenwall was disqualified for alcohol use (he drank several beers just prior to competing).
 John Stephen Akhwari of Tanzania became internationally famous after finishing the marathon, in the last place, despite a dislocated knee.
 This was the first of three Olympic participation by Jacques Rogge. He competed in yachting and would later become the president of the IOC.
 Norma Enriqueta Basilio de Sotelo of Mexico became the first woman to light the Olympic cauldron with the Olympic flame.
 It was the first games at which there was a significant African presence in men's distance running. Africans won at least one medal in all running events from 800 meters to the marathon, and in so doing they set a trend for future games. Most of these runners came from high-altitude areas of countries like Kenya and Ethiopia, and they were well-prepared for the 2240 m elevation of Mexico City.
 Kipchoge Keino of Kenya, competing in spite of unexpected bouts of severe abdominal pain later diagnosed as a gall bladder infection, finished the 10,000 meters in spite of collapsing from pain with two laps to go, won silver in the 5000, and won gold in the 1500 meters.
 It was the first Olympic games in which the closing ceremony was transmitted in color to the world, as well as the events themselves.

Controversies

South Africa

After being banned from participating in 1964, South Africa - under its new leader John Vorster - had made diplomatic overtures to improve relations with neighbouring countries and internationally, suggesting legal changes to allow South Africa to compete with an integrated, multiracial team internationally. The nominal obstacle behind South Africa's exclusion thus removed, the country was thus provisionally invited to the Games, on the understanding that all segregation and discrimination in sport would be eliminated by the 1972 Games. However, African countries and African American athletes promised to boycott the Games if South Africa was present, and Eastern Bloc countries threatened to do likewise. In April 1968 the IOC conceded that "it would be most unwise for South Africa to participate". It was thus the first Olympics where South Africa was positively excluded, which continued until the Olympics of 1992.

Tlatelolco massacre

Responding to growing social unrest and protests, the government of Mexico had increased economic and political suppression, against labor unions in particular, in the decade building up to the Olympics. A series of protest marches in the city in August gathered significant attendance, with an estimated 500,000 taking part on 27 August. President Gustavo Díaz Ordaz ordered the police occupation of the National Autonomous University of Mexico in September, but protests continued. Using the prominence brought by the Olympics, students gathered in Plaza de las Tres Culturas in Tlatelolco to call for greater civil and democratic rights and showed disdain for the Olympics with slogans such as ¡No queremos olimpiadas, queremos revolución! ("We don't want Olympics, we want revolution!").

Ten days before the start of the Olympics, the government ordered the gathering in Plaza de las Tres Culturas to be broken up. Some 5000 soldiers and 200 tankettes surrounded the plaza. Hundreds of protesters and civilians were killed and over 1000 were arrested. At the time, the event was portrayed in the national media as the military suppression of a violent student uprising, but later analysis indicates that the gathering was peaceful prior to the army's advance.

Black Power salute

On 16 October 1968, African American sprinters Tommie Smith and John Carlos, the gold and bronze medalists in the men's 200-meter race, took their places on the podium for the medal ceremony wearing human rights badges and black socks without shoes, lowered their heads and each defiantly raised a black-gloved fist as the Star Spangled Banner was played, in solidarity with the Black Freedom Movement in the United States. Both were members of the Olympic Project for Human Rights. International Olympic Committee (IOC) president Avery Brundage deemed it to be a domestic political statement unfit for the apolitical, international forum the Olympic Games were intended to be. In response to their actions, he ordered Smith and Carlos suspended from the US team and banned from the Olympic Village. When the US Olympic Committee refused, Brundage threatened to ban the entire US track team. This threat led to the expulsion of the two athletes from the Games.

Peter Norman, the Australian sprinter who came second in the 200 m race, also wore an Olympic Project for Human Rights badge during the medal ceremony. Norman was the one who suggested that Carlos and Smith wear one glove each. His actions resulted in him being ostracized by Australian media and a reprimand by his country's Olympic authorities. He was not sent to the 1972 games, despite several times making the qualifying time, though opinions differ over whether that was due to the 1968 protest. When Australia hosted the 2000 Summer Olympics, he had no part in the opening ceremony, though the significance of that is also debated. In 2006, after Norman died of a heart attack, Smith and Carlos were pallbearers at Norman's funeral.

Věra Čáslavská 
In another notable incident in the gymnastics competition, while standing on the medal podium after the balance beam event final, in which Natalia Kuchinskaya of the Soviet Union had controversially taken the gold, Czechoslovakian gymnast Věra Čáslavská quietly turned her head down and away during the playing of the Soviet national anthem. The action was Čáslavská's silent protest against the recent Soviet invasion of Czechoslovakia. Her protest was repeated when she accepted her medal for her floor exercise routine when the judges changed the preliminary scores of the Soviet Larisa Petrik to allow her to tie with Čáslavská for the gold. While Čáslavská's countrymen supported her actions and her outspoken opposition to Soviet control (she had publicly signed and supported Ludvik Vaculik's "Two Thousand Words" manifesto), the new regime responded by banning her from both sporting events and international travel for many years and made her an outcast from society until the fall of communist regime in Czechoslovakia.

Venues

Agustín Melgar Olympic Velodrome – Cycling (track)
Arena México – Boxing
Avándaro Golf Club – Equestrian (eventing)
Campo Marte – Equestrian (dressage, jumping individual)
Campo Militar 1 – Modern pentathlon (riding, running)
Club de Yates de Acapulco – Sailing
Estadio Azteca – Football (final)
Estadio Cuauhtémoc – Football preliminaries
Estadio Nou Camp – Football preliminaries
Estadio Olímpico Universitario – Athletics (also 20 km and 50 km walk), Ceremonies (opening/ closing), Equestrian (jumping team)
Fernando Montes de Oca Fencing Hall – Fencing, Modern pentathlon (fencing)
Francisco Márquez Olympic Pool – Diving, Modern pentathlon (swimming), Swimming, Water polo
Arena Insurgentes – Wrestling
Insurgentes Theatre – Weightlifting
Jalisco Stadium – Football preliminaries
Juan de la Barrera Olympic Gymnasium – Volleyball
Juan Escutia Sports Palace – Basketball, Volleyball
Municipal Stadium – Field hockey
National Auditorium – Gymnastics
Arena Revolución – Volleyball
Satellite Circuit – Cycling (individual road race, road team time trial)
University City Swimming Pool – Water polo
Vicente Suárez Shooting Range – Modern pentathlon (shooting), Shooting
Virgilio Uribe Rowing and Canoeing Course – Canoeing, Rowing
Zócalo – Athletics (marathon start)

Sports
The 1968 Summer Olympic program featured 172 events in the following 18 sports:

 Aquatics

 Road (2)
 Track (5)

 Dressage (2)
 Eventing (2)
 Jumping (2)

 Freestyle (8)
 Greco-Roman (8)

Demonstration sports
 Basque pelota
 Tennis

The organizers declined to hold a judo tournament at the Olympics, even though it had been a full-medal sport four years earlier.  This was the last time judo was not included in the Olympic games.

Participating National Olympic Committees
East Germany and West Germany competed as separate entities for the first time at a Summer Olympiad, and would remain so through 1988.  Barbados competed for the first time as an independent country. Also competing for the first time in a Summer Olympiad were British Honduras (now Belize), Central African Republic, the Democratic Republic of the Congo (as Congo-Kinshasa), El Salvador, Guinea, Honduras, Kuwait, Nicaragua, Paraguay, Sierra Leone, and the United States Virgin Islands. Singapore returned to the Games as an independent country after competing as part of the Malaysian team in 1964. Suriname and Libya actually competed for the first time (in 1960 and 1964, respectively, they took part in the Opening Ceremony, but their athletes later withdrew from the competition. The People's Republic of China last competed at the 1952 Summer Games but had since withdrawn from the IOC due to a dispute with the Republic of China over the right to represent China.

Calendar
All dates are in Central Time Zone (UTC-6)

Boycotting countries 
North Korea withdrew from the 1968 Games because of two incidents that strained its relations with the IOC. First, the IOC had barred North Korean track and field athletes from the 1968 Games because they had participated in the rival Games of the New Emerging Forces (GANEFO) in 1966. Secondly, the IOC had ordered the nation to compete under the name "North Korea" in the 1968 Games, whereas the country itself would have preferred its official name: "Democratic People's Republic of Korea".

Medal count

These are the top ten nations that won medals at the 1968 Games. Host Mexico won 9 medals in total.

See also

 1968 Olympics Black Power salute

References

External links

 The Politics of Hypocrisy – Mexico '68
 Luis Castañeda, "Beyond Tlatelolco: Design, Media and Politics at Mexico '68" article in Grey Room 40 (Summer 2010)
 Result of the 1968 Summer Olympics host city candidacies 
 An article on the American Sprinters Controversy
 The program of the 1968 Mexico City Olympics
 Research Guide to Latin American and Caribbean Sport at the University of Illinois at Urbana-Champaign

 
O
Sports competitions in Mexico City
Olympic Games in Mexico
Olympic Games
Summer Olympics by year
1960s in Mexico City
October 1968 sports events in Mexico